Ellinochori (Greek: Ελληνοχώρι) may refer to the following places in Greece:

Ellinochori, Evros, a village in the Evros regional unit
Ellinochori, Corinthia, a place in Corinthia